The 2013 CAF Beach Soccer Championship took place from 22 May to 26 May 2013, in El Jadida, Morocco, for the first time. It is the second time in Morocco, following Casablanca hosting the previous qualification tournament in 2011. It was originally scheduled for 10–14 April and then for 29 May - 2 June 2013. The two finalists of the championship qualified for the 2013 World Cup and went on to represent Africa in Tahiti in September.

All matches were held at the Mazagan Beach Resort in El Jadida.

Participating teams
Eight teams have confirmed their participation in the competition:

 
 
 
 
 
 
 
 

There was to have been a team from Uganda taking part in the tournament, but they were forced to withdraw due to a lack of funding.

Draw
The draw to divide the eight teams into two groups of four and the determination of the subsequent schedule was held at the Mazagan Beach Resort in El Jadida.

Group stage
All match times are correct to that of local time in El Jadida, being Western European Summer Time, (UTC +1).

Group A

Group B

Knockout stage

Semifinals

Third Place

Final

Winners

Awards

Teams Qualifying

Final Placement

References

2013
Qualification Caf
2013 in beach soccer